The Men's 100 metre freestyle competition of the 2022 FINA World Swimming Championships (25 m) was held on 14 and 15 December 2022.

Records
Prior to the competition, the existing world and championship records were as follows.

The following new records were set during this competition:

Results

Heats
The heats were started on 14 December at 12:03.

Semifinals
The semifinals were started on 14 December at 20:08.

Final
The final was held on 15 December at 19:42.

References

Men's 100 metre freestyle